The Last Penny (French: Le dernier sou) is a 1946 French drama film directed by André Cayatte and starring Ginette Leclerc, Gilbert Gil and Fernand Charpin.  It was one of three films Leclerc appeared in for the collaborationist Continental Films, which she believed led to her arrest by the authorities following the Liberation. Although it was made during the Second World War the film was not released until March 1946.

Synopsis
A secretary tries to save her friend's company from being bankrupted by unscrupulous figures.

Cast
 Jacques Berlioz as Le président du tribunal 
 Fernand Charpin as Colon  
 Guy Decomble 
 Gabrielle Fontan as Mme. Durban  
 Annie France as Jacqueline  
 Gilbert Gil as Pierre Durban  
 René Génin as Perrin  
 Ginette Leclerc as Marcelle Levasseur  
 Noël Roquevert as Stéfani  
 Zélie Yzelle

References

Bibliography 
 Mayne, Judith. Le Corbeau. University of Illinois Press, 2007.

External links 
 

1946 films
French drama films
1946 drama films
1940s French-language films
Films directed by André Cayatte
French black-and-white films
Continental Films films
1940s French films